Maharani Khem Kaur Dhillon (Punjabi ਬੀਬੀ ਖੇਮ ਕੌਰ ਢਿੱਲੋਂ) was a Sikh queen and the second wife of Maharaja Kharak Singh, the second Maharaja of the Sikh Empire.

She was the daughter of Jodh Singh Kalalvala and granddaughter of Sahib Singh Dhillon. In July 1815 she was married Kharak Singh, the oldest son of Maharaja Ranjit Singh, the founder of the Sikh Empire and his queen consort, Maharani Datar Kaur.

Also with her brother, Gurdit Singh and Chanda Singh she aided the Khalsa Army in the rebellion on 1848.

Due to her role in the Second Anglo-Sikh War in 1849, her Jagirs (land) were considerably reduced; as the British deemed her anti-British.

References

"Bibi Khem Kaur Dhillon", URL accessed 11/16/06

Year of birth missing
Year of death missing
Indian Sikhs
Indian princesses
Indian women in war
People of the Second Anglo-Sikh War
Women in 19th-century warfare
19th-century Indian women
19th-century Indian people